Granados may refer to:

Places
Granados, Baja Verapaz, Guatemala
Granados, Sonora, Mexico
Granados Municipality, Sonora

People
 Enrique Granados (1867–1916), Spanish composer
 Federico Tinoco Granados (1870–1931), president of Costa Rica
 Jorge García Granados  (1900–1961), politician and diplomat from Guatemala
 Miguel García Granados (1809–1878), president of Guatemala
 Steven Granados-Portelance, Canadian drag queen